Rachman Halim (30 July 1947 – 27 July 2008) was a Chinese Indonesian businessman.

Early life 
Halim was born Tjoa Too Hing (Hokkien: Chhoà Tō-hêng) in Kediri, East Java to a prominent Chinese Indonesian (Hokchia totok) family.  He was the first son of Surya Wonowidjojo (Tjoa Jien Hwie), founder of Gudang Garam, a major Indonesian kretek (clove cigarette) manufacturer.

Halim succeeded his father to become the CEO of Gudang Garam in 1984, and expanded the company into other fields

Legacy 
Forbes, an American business publication, ranked him and his family as the richest in Indonesia for a number of years and listed them in 2005 as having a net worth of US$2.8 billion.

Death 
Halim died at Mount Elizabeth Hospital in Singapore in 2008 after a week of treatment for a coronary illness.

References

Wonowidjojo family
1947 births
2008 deaths
20th-century Indonesian businesspeople
Indonesian people of Chinese descent
Indonesian Buddhists
Indonesian billionaires
Place of birth missing